Olivier Jean-Claude Latry (born 22 February 1962) is a French organist, improviser, and composer. He is professor of organ in the Conservatoire de Paris. 	

He became interested in the organ after listening to recordings by Pierre Cochereau. His first experience with a church organ was in 1974, when he played the organ at his local church at his older brother's wedding. During the homily, his arms supposedly fell on the organ console, causing a rather dissonant noise in the church. 	

Latry was born in Boulogne-sur-Mer, the youngest of three children (Christian, Jean-Yves, Olivier) born to Robert Latry and Andrée Thomas.  After having begun his musical studies in his hometown, in 1978 he enrolled in the organ class under the blind organist Gaston Litaize at the Academy of Saint-Maur who he heard in concert, and took composition classes with Jean-Claude Raynaud at the Paris Academy. Both studied under Marcel Dupré. After becoming Professor of Organ in the Catholic Institute of Paris in 1983 and subsequently at the Academy of Rheims, he succeeded Gaston Litaize at the Academy of Saint-Maur in 1990. In 1995, Latry was named professor of organ in the Academy of Paris, a post held jointly with Michel Bouvard.

In 1985, at 23 years of age, Latry was awarded the post of one of four titulaires des grandes orgues of Notre-Dame, Paris together with Yves Devernay, Philippe Lefèbvre and Jean-Pierre Leguay, following the death of Pierre Cochereau.

In addition to this role and his teaching positions, Latry carries out a career as concert performer: he has played in over forty countries across five continents, in particular in the United States, where he made his first tour in 1986, becoming one of the most popular French organists in that country.

Latry does not intend to specialize in music of a specific time period, but has gained a reputation for performing music by his contemporaries.  He is renowned for his performances of the works of Olivier Messiaen and has recorded the complete organ works of Messiaen for Deutsche Grammophon. Latry is also considered to be a distinguished improviser, in the tradition of a distinguished French line that runs from Charles Tournemire through to Pierre Cochereau. Influenced by his Roman Catholic faith, he based his 2007 organ composition Salve Regina, reflections on the Gregorian Marian hymn, on previous improvisations.

References

External links 

 Olivier Latry's biography 

People from Boulogne-sur-Mer
1962 births
Living people
Organ improvisers
French classical organists
French male organists
Cathedral organists
Pedal piano players
Deutsche Grammophon artists
Conservatoire de Paris alumni
Academic staff of the Conservatoire de Paris
21st-century organists
21st-century French male musicians
20th-century organists
20th-century French male musicians
20th-century French musicians
21st-century French musicians
Male classical organists